The Division of Kennedy is an Australian electoral division in the state of Queensland.

It is a conservative seat and has been held by Bob Katter since 1993.

History

The division was proclaimed in 1900, and was one of the original 65 divisions to be contested at the first federal election. It is named after Edmund Kennedy, an explorer in the area where the division is located in Queensland.

The member since 1993 is Bob Katter Jr., the leader of Katter's Australian Party. He was previously elected as a member of the National Party, but became an independent in 2001 before forming his own party in 2011.

Geographically, the electorate is rural. It takes in the Pacific coast of Queensland between Cairns and Townsville, including a small portion of Cairns itself, before sweeping westward to take in most of Queensland's northern outback—a large, increasingly sparsely populated area stretching west to the border with the Northern Territory. The largest population centre in the electorate is the city of Mount Isa, in its far west. Until 1949, the electorate was even larger, encompassing most of the state north of Townsville, becoming still larger when it absorbed Cairns in 1934. However, much of its northern portion, including the Cairns area, became the Division of Leichhardt in 1949.

Kennedy was held by the Australian Labor Party for most of the first half of the 20th century, and was one of the few country seats where Labor consistently did well. From Federation until 1966, Labor held it for all but two terms. However, since 1966 it has been held by the conservative Katter family—Bob Sr. and his son, Bob Jr.—for all but one term. It has long since shaken off its Labor past, and is now often colloquially nicknamed 'Katter Country'. A few Labor pockets still exist in Mount Isa, which was represented by Labor at the state level as late as 2012, as well as around Cairns and Townsville. However, they are no match for the heavily conservative bent of the rest of the seat, which is now considered one of the most overall conservative in Australia.

Besides the Katters, other prominent members include Charles McDonald, the first Labor Speaker of the Australian House of Representatives, and Bill Riordan, a minister in the Chifley government.

Darby Riordan held the seat from 1929 until his death in 1936. His nephew, Bill, won the seat at the ensuing by-election and held it until his retirement in 1966. Bob Katter Sr. won it in the 1966 Coalition landslide, holding it until 1990. His son and current member, Bob Jr. defeated his father's successor, Rob Hulls, in 1993. Hulls would later become Deputy Premier of Victoria.

Since 1984, federal electoral division boundaries in Australia have been determined at redistributions by a redistribution committee appointed by the Australian Electoral Commission. Redistributions occur for the boundaries of divisions in a particular state, and they occur every seven years, or sooner if a state's representation entitlement changes or when divisions of a state are malapportioned.

At the 2013 election, sitting member Bob Jr. faced his first serious contest in two decades. He'd gone into the election holding Kennedy with a margin of 18 per cent, making Kennedy the second-safest seat in Australia. However, Liberal National candidate Noeline Ikin was well ahead on the primary vote by 10,000 votes. Katter narrowly pulled through and won another term on Labor preferences. However, he suffered a swing of 17 per cent, reducing his majority to only 2.19 per cent.

Katter did not however face a rematch against Ikin at the 2016 election due to her having a brain tumour which forced her out of the election. (The tumour ultimately claimed Ikin's life in 2017.)
At that election, Katter picked up a swing of almost nine per cent, making it a safe seat once again.

Kennedy was one of the 17 (out of 150) electorates that voted ‘no’ in the Australian Marriage Law Postal Survey.

Members

Election results

References

External links
 Division of Kennedy (Qld) — Australian Electoral Commission

Electoral divisions of Australia
Constituencies established in 1901
1901 establishments in Australia
Federal politics in Queensland
Far North Queensland
North West Queensland